Julian Neil Rohan Wadham (born 7 August 1958) is an English actor of stage, film and television.

Early life
He was educated at Ampleforth College and the Central School of Speech and Drama, third son of Rohan Nicholas Wadham DFC and Juliana Wadham, née Macdonald Walker.
Wadham attended Ampleforth College and the Central School of Speech and Drama.

Career
His theatre work includes playing Barclay, soon after leaving the Central School, in the original West End production of Julian Mitchell's Another Country at the Queens Theatre with Rupert Everett and Kenneth Branagh. In 2014 he played Vaughan Cunningham, a visitor to the school, in the Trafalgar Studio revival of the play.

For the English Stage Company at the Royal Court he was directed by Max Stafford-Clark in Falkland Sound, as Lieutenant David Tinker RN (with Paul Jesson, Lesley Manville and Marion Bailey), as Captain Plume in George Farquhar's The Recruiting Officer, as Lt. Ralph Clark in Timberlake Wertenbaker's Our Country's Good and as Jake in Caryl Churchill's Serious Money (with Linda Bassett, Lesley Manville, Alfred Molina, Gary Oldman and Meera Syal).

For director Jeremy Herrin he appeared with Lindsay Duncan, Matt Smith and Felicity Jones as Hugh in Polly Stenham's That Face, both at the Royal Court and at the Duke of York's Theatre. Herrin also directed him in the National Theatre production of James Graham's This House, as Humphrey Atkins, in both Cottesloe and Olivier theatres, and in the West End revival of Another Country, in which he played Vaughan Cunningham. Other National Theatre work includes productions directed by Sir Nicholas Hytner of The Madness of King George (in which he played Prime Minister William Pitt opposite Sir Nigel Hawthorne's King George), Don Pedro in Much Ado About Nothing (with Simon Russell Beale and Zoe Wanamaker), Polixenes (with Alex Jennings, Deborah Findlay, and Claire Skinner) in The Winter's Tale, Tartuffe (with Martin Clunes, David Threlfall and Maggie Tyzack), The Changeling (with Miranda Richardson, directed by Richard Eyre) and Mountain Language (directed by Harold Pinter).

Other theatre includes Antonio in The Tempest at the Haymarket (directed by Trevor Nunn with Ralph Fiennes), as Duke Theseus in A Midsummer Night's Dream at the Rose Theatre (with Judi Dench and directed by Peter Hall), Marshall Dorfling in The Prince of Homburg at the Donmar Warehouse, Raymond Brock in Plenty (with Cate Blanchett) for the Almeida at the Albery, Elyot in Private Lives (Theatre Royal Bath), The Good Samaritan (Hampstead), A Letter of Resignation at the Comedy (with Edward Fox and Claire Higgins), and When We Are Married at the Whitehall.

Television roles include The Casual Vacancy, Silk, Midsomer Murders, Lewis, Middlemarch, Father Brown, The Trial of Lord Lucan (as Lord Lucan), Rosemary and Thyme and Dalziel and Pascoe.

In December 2014 he finished filming for Miramax The 9th Life of Louis Drax scripted by Max Minghella, with Aaron Paul, Jamie Dornan, Sarah Gadon, Oliver Platt, Molly Parker and Barbara Hershey.

As at December 2015 he is continuing to recreate the role of John Steed in Big Finish's audio series The Avengers - The Lost Episodes.

Works

Film

Maurice (1987) - Hull
The Madness of King George (1994) - Pitt the Younger
The Secret Agent (1996) - The Assistant Commissioner
The English Patient (1996, included in a 1996 nomination for Best Cast for the film) - Madox
Preaching to the Perverted (1997) - M'Learned Friend
Keep the Aspidistra Flying (1997) - Ravelston
The Commissioner (1998) - Prime minister
High Heels and Low Lifes (2001) - Rogers
Gypsy Woman (2001) - Stanley
A Different Loyalty (2004) - Andrew Darcy
Exorcist: The Beginning (2004) - Major Granville
Dominion: Prequel to the Exorcist (2005) - Major Granville
Wah-Wah (2005) - Charles Bingham
Goya's Ghosts (2006) - Joseph Bonaparte
Outpost (2008) - Hunt
Fake Identity (2008) - Sterling
Legacy (2009) - Gregor Salenko
War Horse (2010) - Trench Captain
The Iron Lady (2011) - Francis Pym
Cheerful Weather for the Wedding (2012) - Uncle Bob
Outpost: Black Sun (2012) - Francis Hunt
Now Is Good (2012) - Dr. Ryan
The Scapegoat (2012) - Headmaster
National Theatre Live: This House (2013) - Humphrey Atkins
Queen and Country (2014) - Colonel Fielding
The Riot Club (2014) - Miles' Father
The 9th Life of Louis Drax (2016) - Dr. Janek
Churchill (2017) - General Montgomery
Victoria & Abdul (2017) - Alick Yorke
Tokyo Trial (2017) - Erima H. Northcroft
Colette (2018) - Ollendorff
The Happy Prince (2018) - Mr. Arbuthnott
The Song of Names (2019) - Arbuthnot Bailey

Television

Country (1981)
Blind Justice (1988)
Casualty (1988)
Bergerac (1990)
Agatha Christie's Poirot  - "The Plymouth Express" - Robert Carrington (1991)
Middlemarch (1994)
The Trial of Lord Lucan - Lord Lucan (1997)
A Dance to the Music of Time (1997)
Pie in the Sky - Series 3, Episode 35, "Pork Pies" (1997)
Catherine Cookson - The Wingless Bird - Reginald Farrier - TV miniseries (1997)
Highlander: The Raven - "The Ex-Files" (1999)
Midsomer Murders (Episode: "Death's Shadow") (1999) as Simon Fletcher
The Inspector Lynley Mysteries - "Payment in Blood" (2001)
Hitler: The Rise of Evil as Captain Karl Mayr (2003)
Island at War (2004)
Rosemary & Thyme - Episode 2.13 (2004)
Tom Brown's Schooldays as Squire Brown (2005)
Dalziel and Pascoe - Series 9 "Dust Thou Art" (2005)
Egypt - Episodes 1 and 2, as Lord Carnarvon (2005)
Taggart - Series 22, Episode 4 Running Out of Time as Brigadier Johnny Lewis-Scott (2005)
The Government Inspector - Jonathan Powell (2005)
Agatha Christie's Marple - "Sleeping Murder" “Kelvin Halliday” (2006)
Nuremberg: Nazis on Trial (2006)
Ghostboat - Captain Nathan Byrnes (2006)
My Boy Jack (2007)
Foyle's War - "Plan of Attack" (2008)
Midsomer Murders (Episode: "The Creeper") (2009) as William Chettham
Lewis - "The Point of Vanishing" (2009)
Downton Abbey ‘’General Sir Herbert Strutt’’ - Episode 2.3 (2012)
Father Brown - "The Flying Stars" - "Colonel Adams" (2013)
Silk (2013)
The Casual Vacancy (2015)
Tokyo Trial (2016), Erima Harvey Northcroft
The Singapore Grip as Soloman Langfield (2019)

Audio

 The Minister of Chance as The Minister of Chance (2011-2013)

Theatre
 Another Country, Queens Theatre
 When We Are Married, Whitehall Theatre
 Falkland Sound, Royal Court
 Serious Money, Royal Court
 Our Country's Good, Royal Court
 The Recruiting Officer, Royal Court
 Carrington, Royal National Theatre
 Mountain Language, Royal National Theatre
 The Changeling, Royal National Theatre
 Once in a While the Odd Thing Happens, Royal National Theatre
 The Madness of George III, Royal National Theatre
 Plenty, Almeida at the Albery
 The Good Samaritan, Hampstead Theatre
 The Winter's Tale, Royal National Theatre
 Tartuffe, Royal National Theatre
 Private Lives, Theatre Royal Bath
 That Face, Royal Court
 Much Ado About Nothing, Royal National Theatre
 A Midsummer Night's Dream, Rose Theatre, Kingston
 The Prince of Homburg, Donmar Warehouse
 The Tempest, Theatre Royal Haymarket
 This House, Royal National Theatre
 Another Country, Theatre Royal Bath/Chichester Festival Theatre/Trafalgar Studio

Awards and nominations

References

External links

Julian Wadham CV at The Artists Partnership

Living people
1958 births
English male film actors
English male stage actors
English male television actors
People from Ware, Hertfordshire
Actors from Hertfordshire
People educated at Ampleforth College
Place of birth missing (living people)